was a Japanese gangster.

Born in Kobe, he joined the Japanese Imperial Navy air squadron during World War II. After the war, he became a city employee of the Kobe City Office. In 1955, he joined a clan with Yakuza leader Nakayama Yoshikazu under a branch of the Yamaguchi-gumi. Over the next 40 years, he rose up the ladder in his gang and held the rank of sō-honbuchō, the headquarters chief of the Yamaguchi-gumi.

In late 2005, he was named leader of a more recent Yamaguchi-gumi clan, called the Hanshin-kai. He was also the godfather or kumichō of the Kishimoto-gumi.

References

Japanese crime bosses
2014 deaths
1928 births
Imperial Japanese Navy personnel of World War II